Miroslav Drobňák (born 29 May 1977) is a Slovak football midfielder who currently plays for club ŠK Odeva Lipany.

References

1977 births
Living people
Association football midfielders
Slovak footballers
Slovakia international footballers
Slovakia under-21 international footballers
1. FC Tatran Prešov players
FK Inter Bratislava players
FC VSS Košice players
Dyskobolia Grodzisk Wielkopolski players
Xanthi F.C. players
Slovak Super Liga players
Super League Greece players
Ekstraklasa players
Expatriate footballers in Poland
Expatriate footballers in Greece
People from Sabinov District
Sportspeople from the Prešov Region